The Women's 60 metres event  at the 2005 European Athletics Indoor Championships was held on March 4–5.

Medalists

Results

Heats
First 3 of each heat (Q) and the next 4 fastest (q) qualified for the semifinals.

Semifinals
First 4 of each semifinals qualified directly (Q) for the final.

Final

References
Results

60 metres at the European Athletics Indoor Championships
60
2005 in women's athletics